Dignius is a monotypic moth genus of the family Erebidae. Its only species, Dignius buchsbaumi, is known from Bali. Both the genus and the species were first described by Michael Fibiger, the genus in 2010 and the species one year later.

The wingspan is about 12 mm. The head, patagia, tegulae, thorax, and ground colour of the forewing are dark greyish brown. The antemedial and subterminal lines are well marked, black and almost straight. The other lines are weakly marked, except for the narrow terminal line. The hindwing is grey, without a discal spot. The underside is grey, but the costal area of both wings is suffused with black scales, without a discal spot.

References

Micronoctuini
Noctuoidea genera
Monotypic moth genera